WSO2 Carbon is the core platform on which WSO2 middleware products are built. It is based on Java OSGi technology, which allows components to be dynamically installed, started, stopped, updated, and uninstalled, and it eliminates component version conflicts. In Carbon, this capability translates into a solid core of common middleware enterprise components, including clustering, security, logging, and monitoring, plus the ability to add components for specific features needed to solve a specific enterprise scenario.

WSO2 Carbon was introduced in 2009 and received InfoWorld's 2009 'Best of Open Source Software', or "Bossie", award.

References

Java platform